The Michigan Community College Athletic Association (MCCAA) is a junior college conference throughout Michigan and northern Indiana in Region 12 of the National Junior College Athletic Association (NJCAA).

The men's sports organized by the MCCAA are: soccer, cross country, basketball, baseball, bowling, wrestling and golf. The women's sports organized by the MCCAA are: volleyball, soccer, cross country, basketball, bowling, and softball.

Member schools

Current members 
The MCCAA currently has 24 full members, all but one are public schools:

Notes

Former members 
The MCCAA had one former full members, which was also a private school:

Notes

Sports sponsored

See also
Ohio Community College Athletic Conference, also in NJCAA Region 12

References

External links
 
 NJCAA Website
NJCAA Region 12 website